Francis Joseph Grund (September 19, 1805 – September 29, 1863) was a Bohemian-born American journalist and author who wrote such works as The Americans in Their Moral, Social, and Political Relations (1837).

Early life

Grund was born in Reichenberg, Bohemia (now Liberec, Czech Republic). His parents were Wenzel Grund, a furrier, and Anna Weber Grund. The family was Roman Catholic.

Reportedly, he studied at the Vienna Polyteknik and at the University of Vienna, and he is said to have worked as a teacher in Rio de Janeiro before he came to the United States. He spoke several languages, including German, English, and French.

In America

In 1827, at the age of 21, Grund was working as a mathematics teacher in Boston. The same year, he failed to get a University of Pennsylvania professorship, and he ended up teaching mathematics at a military academy. From 1828 to 1833, he taught at a private school in Boston. Grund's wife was from Philadelphia.

In the following years, Grund worked primarily as a journalist and editor, writing for such newspapers as Standard, the German-language Der Pennsylvanisch Deutsche, Mercury and Evening Journal, Public Ledger, and Sun. He published several books, including The Americans in Their Moral, Social, and Political Relations (1837) and Aristocracy in America: From the Sketch-Book of a German Nobleman (1839). In The Americans, he wrote the following, oft-quoted characterization:

In his writings and public speeches, Grund campaigned in favor of various politicians, including Martin van Buren, William Henry Harrison, and James Buchanan. The Buchanan administration hired him as a special agent who was sent to Europe to report on political and commercial developments there.

References

1805 births
1863 deaths
Writers from Liberec
German emigrants to the United States
19th-century American journalists
American male journalists
19th-century American male writers
German Bohemian people